Milk + Bookies is a 501(c)(3) non-profit organization based in the United States. The organization's stated mission is two-fold: 1) providing opportunities for children to experience giving back to their community and 2) literacy promotion in underserved areas of the population. While book donations are an integral element of the Milk + Bookies' mission, another cornerstone of their program is Service Learning: instilling the seed of giving into each child participant, sparking feelings of importance, self-confidence, and the desire to give and give again.

History 
Milk + Bookies was founded in 2004 by Meredith Alexander, a Los Angeles-based mother of two. In 2009, Heidi Lindelof and Laura Zimmerman, also Los Angeles-based moms, joined Meredith on the Milk + Bookies Board of Directors. That same year, Milk + Bookies was designated a 501(c)(3) non-profit corporation.

Programs 

Milk + Bookies' programs include:

M+B Class Project 

Through Milk + Bookies, kids of all ages host events in their local school or hometown bookstore and are eligible to earn community service hours. The M+B Class Project requires the hosts to invite families with young children to spend the day celebrating books and experience giving. Children ages 3 and up are asked to choose, purchase and inscribe a book to be donated to a local child of a similar age who has little or no access to books. The events often include music, story-inspired arts & crafts and milk & cookies. Milk + Bookies provides students with a checklist on the necessary steps for hosting a Milk + Bookies Class Project event. The student hosts are then charged with finding a recipient group for delivery of the book donations. In the past, Milk + Bookies has recommended the following organizations as recipients of donations: Operation School Bell, Head Start or Boys and Girls Clubs of America.

M+B Birthday Party 

The Milk + Bookies Birthday Party was conceived as a way to provide parents with an alternative for hosting a birthday party for their child, with the emphasis veering away from excessive gifts. Guests are asked to bring a new or gently used children's book in lieu of a gift for the birthday child. Milk + Bookies provides hosts with a "Bookies Box" which contains the necessary materials for hosting: bookplates, balloons, "I Donated" stickers, bookmarks and Milk + Bookies literature to facilitate parent discussions with young children regarding the importance of helping others. The guests are given the option of inscribing bookplates to adhere to their donation and subsequently receiving an "I Donated" sticker to wear. The birthday child and family choose a recipient group, then deliver the books to the recipients so that the birthday child can experience the joy of giving personally.

Leaders + Readers 

Leaders + Readers is a special Milk + Bookies program designed to encourage student volunteers in the Los Angeles community, organizing book drives to benefit another Los Angeles based "sister" school. The goal of every Leaders + Readers Book Drive is to flood underserved Los Angeles schools with books to support learning and academic excellence, and allow students to gain experience with leadership and community service.

Recent activities 

On April 19, 2015, Milk + Bookies hosted their 6th Annual Story Time Celebration at the Skirball Cultural Center in Los Angeles. There were cookies, ice cream, fun games and crafts, and your favorite celebrities reading your favorite stories. Celebrity readers included J. J. Abrams, Tom Felton, Henry Winkler, Julie Bowen, Jaya Mays, and Dan Bucatinsky. Children were also able to donate over 3,000 books via Operation School Bell to kids who previously had never owned a storybook.

Notable people involved 

Milk + Bookies receives a great deal of assistance and involvement from celebrities as well as organizations and individuals based both locally in Los Angeles and nationwide.

Celebrities
 Jennifer Garner
 Rainn Wilson
 Jason Biggs
 Peter Facinelli
 Hayden Panettiere
 Jack Coleman
 Masi Oka
 Dave Grohl
 Jennie Garth
 Marlon Wayans
 Jonah Hill
 Max Greenfield
 Jenny Mollen
 Julie Bowen
 Eric Stonestreet
 Peyton List
 Ginnifer Goodwin
 Don Cheadle
 DJ Lance Rock
 Marla Sokoloff
 Amanda Peet
 Chris Pine
 Chris Messina
 Nathan Fillion
 Jenna Elfman
 Sarah Chalke
 Jerry Ferrara
 Josh Holloway
 Maya Rudolph
 Josh Dallas
 J. J. Abrams
 Dallas Clayton
 Adam Scott
 Jack Black
 Dan Bucatinsky
 Ariel Winter
 Gwen Stefani
 Jayma Mays
 Mark Feuerstein
 Constance Zimmer
 Tom Everett Scott
 Elisabeth Röhm
 Busy Philipps
 Malin Åkerman
 Garcelle Beauvais
 Tiffani Thiessen
 Sarah Michelle Gellar
 Zachary Quinto
 Ali Wentworth
 Elizabeth Banks
 Ashlee Simpson
 Pete Wentz
 Megan Nicole
 Henry Winkler
 Stefan Lessard
 Damon Lindelof
 Kat Dennings
 John Cho
 Gwendoline Christie
 Lena Dunham
 Adam Campbell
 Ali Larter
 Glenn Howerton
 Molly Sims
 KaDee Strickland
 Joe Hahn
 Jonathan Schaech
 Heather McDonald
 Majandra Delfino
 David Walton
 Jillian Rose Reed
 Skai Jackson
 Danielle Panabaker
 Rebecca Gayheart
 Eric Dane
 Tom Felton
 Naomi Scott
 Karan Brar
 Jason Behr
 Lena Headey
 Tamera Mowry
 Miranda Cosgrove
 David Koechner
 B. J. Novak
 Paget Brewster

Sponsors and Partner Organizations
 Tiny Prints
 little junebugs
 The Land of Nod
 Discover Books
 The Honest Company
 Isabella's Cookie Company
 McConnell's Ice Cream
 Ralphs
 Punchbowl.com
 Ergobaby
 TOMS
 Annie's Homegrown
 SoulCycle
 Bakeology
 Skirball Cultural Center
 Barnes & Noble
 Truth Be Told PR
 Elements Events
 John W. Carson Foundation
 Marc Jacobs
 The Langham Huntington Pasadena Hotel
 Dylan's Candy Bar
 Crafting Community
 Disney/ABC Television Group
 DreamWorks Studios
 Splendid
 The Mother Company
 Tot Squad
 The Gap

References

External links 
Official Website: http://www.milkandbookies.org

Affiliated Blog: http://www.acmesharing.com/

Social Media
 Flickr Page: https://www.flickr.com/photos/53182588@N04/
 Pinterest Account: http://pinterest.com/milkandbookies/

Children's charities based in the United States
Organizations promoting literacy
Organizations established in 2004
Charities based in California